Simrad may refer to:
 Simrad, a brand name used by Kongsberg Maritime
 Simrad Optronics, a Norwegian company that manufactures defence equipment
 Simrad Yachting, a manufacturer of marine electronics for the leisure and professional markets